The World Boxing Organization (WBO) is an organization which sanctions professional boxing bouts.  It is recognized by the International Boxing Hall of Fame (IBHOF) as one of the four major world championship groups, alongside the World Boxing Association (WBA), World Boxing Council (WBC), and International Boxing Federation (IBF). The WBO's headquarters are located in San Juan, Puerto Rico.

History
The WBO started after a group of Puerto Rican and Dominican businessmen broke out of the WBA's 1988 annual convention in Isla Margarita, Venezuela over disputes regarding what rules should be applied.

The WBO's first president was Ramon Pina Acevedo of the Dominican Republic. Soon after its beginning, the WBO was staging world championship bouts around the globe. Its first championship fight was for its vacant super middleweight title, between Thomas Hearns and James Kinchen; Hearns won by decision. In order to gain respectability, the WBO next elected former world light heavyweight champion José Torres of Ponce, Puerto Rico, as its president. Torres left in 1996, giving way to Puerto Rican lawyer Francisco Valcarcel as president. Valcarcel has held that position since.

While the IBF had awarded recognition to Larry Holmes soon after its inception in 1983 (as they did with several established champions in the lower weight divisions), the WBO sanctioned a fight between two relatively unknown fighters, Francesco Damiani (winner of the super heavyweight silver medal at the 1984 Summer Olympics) and Johnny DuPlooy, to determine the inaugural holder of its own heavyweight title in 1989. All other sanctioning bodies of boxing recognized the then-undefeated Mike Tyson as the undisputed heavyweight champion. Damiani, meanwhile, went on to become the first WBO heavyweight champion. At heavyweight, especially in the United States, the organization initially struggled to gain credibility as a major sanctioning body, with WBO heavyweight champions Michael Moorer, Riddick Bowe, and Henry Akinwande relinquishing the title to pursue other options. Boxing publication The Ring also did not recognize the WBO, despite having recognized the IBF after its inception in 1983, five years prior to the WBO.

In the lighter weight divisions, however, long-reigning champions during the 1990s such as Chris Eubank, Dariusz Michalczewski, Johnny Tapia, and Naseem Hamed gave the WBO title increasingly more prestige. The WBO was also made popular by boxers such as Marco Antonio Barrera, Oscar De La Hoya, Nigel Benn, Ronald "Winky" Wright, Joe Calzaghe, and Wladimir Klitschko, all of whom held its title.

On August 23, 1997, WBC minimumweight champion Ricardo López won the WBO minimumweight title by knocking out Puerto Rican fighter Alex Sánchez. After the bout, López told a Mexican newspaper that he wanted to give his newly won championship belt to his father, who is a boxing fan. WBO president Francisco Valcarcel said he viewed that comment as a public resignation and declared the title vacant without holding a hearing or notifying López. The WBO sanctioned a bout between Eric Jamili (10–5–1) and Mickey Cantwell (13–4–1) to fill the vacancy despite protests by López.

In Europe, the WBO was more accepted during its early years than in the U.S., and WBO champions always fared well in unification bouts with WBA, WBC, and IBF champions. For example, WBO light heavyweight champion Michalczewski unified his title with the WBA and IBF titles by defeating Virgil Hill. WBO featherweight champion Naseem Hamed also defeated the reigning WBA, WBC and IBF champions in the same weight class. By 2000, the WBA was giving the same recognition to WBO champions as it did to WBC and IBF champions.

In 2004 the WBC began naming WBO champions on its ranking listings.  The IBF did not recognize the WBO in May 2006, but was doing so by February 2007. WBO regulations explicitly recognize the other three sanctioning bodies. For many years, as with the IBF, boxers based in Japan were not permitted to fight for WBO titles. In 2012, the Japan Boxing Commission (JBC) recognized the governing body. In August 2016, the WBO Asia Pacific Championship was recognized by the JBC and the Japan Professional Boxing Association (JPBA).

WBO men's championship belts are brown, whereas women's championship belts are pink.

In response to the 2022 Russian invasion of Ukraine, the WBO blocked championship fights involving Russian and Belarusian boxers.

Super titles
Since the early 2000s, the WBO has awarded the honorary title of "Super Champion" to certain boxers, in any given weight class, who fulfil a set of distinguished criteria. Boxers who have been named WBO Super Champion include: Anthony Joshua, Wladimir Klitschko, Oleksandr Usyk, Joe Calzaghe, Oscar De La Hoya, Bernard Hopkins, Jermain Taylor, Kelly Pavlik, Saúl Álvarez, Juan Manuel Márquez, Juan Díaz, Manny Pacquiao, Timothy Bradley, Marco Antonio Barrera, Fernando Montiel, Jorge Arce, Omar Narváez, Donnie Nietes, Kosei Tanaka, Iván Calderón, Marco Huck, Sergey Kovalev, Vasyl Lomachenko, and Terence Crawford. There are currently only two female boxers who earned the distinction of "Super Champion": Amanda Serrano and Claressa Shields.

This title is not an actual world championship in the same vein as the WBA's Super titles; it is more akin to a lifetime achievement award. A boxer awarded the status of WBO Super Champion cannot win the title from or lose it to another boxer; recognition as Super Champion can be maintained even if a boxer moves to another weight class.

Ranking system
The WBO publishes monthly rankings, with fighters that win regional championships sanctioned by its subsidiaries being given priority. The World Championship Committee exists to name a mandatory challenger, whom the incumbent champion is forced to fight within an arbitrary timeframe, when this term should be extended, when eliminatories are warranted and when a title is stripped. The body is also responsible for determining who the challengers should be in the case of vacancy or the necessity of an interim title. Exception to this rule are those recognized as "Super Champions", who can directly challenge for the world championship in another division even if they have not fought in it before. There are other superficial differences between the WBO and other bodies, such as the listing of the 140 lb. division as "junior welterweight", whereas the WBC uses the term "super lightweight".

Prior to the WBO being recognized as a major sanctioning body, the system displayed vulnerability when deceased boxer Darrin Morris was moved up twice in the super-middleweights in 2001. In addition, Morris had only fought once in the three years before his death, beating a fighter with only 17 wins out of 81 fights. Morris was Number 7 at the time of his death and Number 5 when the WBO discovered the error. Valcarcel said, "We obviously missed the fact that Darrin was dead. It is regrettable." Valcarcel also stated that other boxing sanctioning organizations had made similar errors in the past by continuing to rank another boxer after he was dead. One week after British newspaper The Independent broke the story that one of the three men ranking the boxers, Gordon Volkman, still had not heard that Morris was dead.

Relationship with other bodies
Under Valcárcel, the WBO was the only sanctioning body that was absent from a summit held in 2014 where the possibility of a single champion per division was to be discussed. In 2014, he publicly opposed the awarding of half-points within the 10-Point Must System favored by the other three. Individually, Valcárcel has also been critical of the WBC for creating the "Maya Belt" and placing it in play in fights where the WBO title was at stake. Another topic that he commented negatively about was the WBA's sanctioning of up to four champions per division. Despite this, following the onset of the COVID-19 pandemic and the economic impact on the sport, the WBO invited the presidents of the other organizations to a reunion of its executive board held in October 2021. The main topic of concern was how to manage the mandatory challengers of unified and undisputed champions, in lieu of the promoters and television/streaming platforms complaining about the logistics of consecutive obligatory defenses. This was the first time that the leaders of the four main organizations met personally, with the idea of sanctioning a single champion per division being discussed.

In other media
The series finale of Japanese manga series Bleach revolves around the main cast gathering to watch a fight in which a character named Yasutora Sado is involved, having become a professional boxer ten years after the storyline and challenging for the WBO world heavyweight championship.

Current WBO world title holders 
As of

Male

Female

WBO affiliated organizations
 North American Boxing Organization (NABO)
 WBO Latino
 WBO Asia Pacific
 Indian Professional Boxing Association (IPBA)

See also
List of major boxing sanctioning bodies
 List of WBO world champions
 List of WBO female world champions
List of current world boxing champions

References

External links 
 World Boxing Organization official website
 All-time WBO World champions – Reference book

 
International sports organizations
Professional boxing organizations
International organizations based in Puerto Rico
Sports organizations established in 1988
1988 establishments in Puerto Rico
Organizations based in San Juan, Puerto Rico
Sports governing bodies in Puerto Rico